The 1965–66 Primera División de Fútbol Profesional season is the th tournament of El Salvador's Primera División since its establishment of the National League system in 1948. The tournament began on 19 September 1965 and finished on July 10, 1966.
Alianza F.C. secured its first Primera División title.

Team Information

Personnel and sponsoring

League standings

Top scorers

List of foreign players in the league
This is a list of foreign players in 1965-66 Campeonato. The following players:
have played at least one apetura game for the respective club.
have not been capped for the El Salvador national football team on any level, independently from the birthplace

ADLER
  Hugo Ponce
  Tomas Gamboa

C.D. Águila
  
 
Alianza F.C.
  Miguel Hermosilla
  Ricardo Sepúlveda
  Guido Alvarado
  Luis Ernesto Tapia

Atletico Marte
  Juan Andres Rios
  Rodolfo Baello
  Raul Pibe Vasquez
  Jose Luis Soto

Atlante
  Rodrigo Gallardo
  Anrias Ruiz

 (player released mid season)
  (player Injured mid season)
 Injury replacement player

C.D. FAS
  Nelson San Lorenzo
  Hugo Sigliano
  Adonay Alfaro
  Carlos Marin
  Walter Aldana

Juventud Olimpico
  Roberto Castelli

Once Municipal
  Jorge Alberto Diz
  Oswaldo Crosta
  Tarcisio Rodríguez
  Jose Manuel Lopez
  William Salas
  Gerardo Alfaro

Quequeisque
 

UES
  Rubén Filomeno
  Raúl Canario Avellaneda
  Víctor Viteca Pereira

External links

1965
1965–66 in Salvadoran football